Matthew Lawrence Janning (born June 22, 1988) is an American-born naturalized Georgian professional basketball player for Kawasaki Brave Thunders of the B.League.

High school career
A combo guard, Janning attended Watertown-Mayer High School, where he averaged a Metro-high 31.8 points per game and 8.4 rebounds, earning All-Conference honors three times, a two-time All-Area award and was a two-time team MVP.

College career
After high school, Janning played college basketball with the Northeastern University Huskies. He was proclaimed as one of Northeastern University's most prolific scorers of the program after ending as the program's fourth all-time leading scorer with 1,836 points. He was a three-time All-CAA performer, including first-team honors in 2009 and 2010.

Professional career
After going undrafted in the 2010 NBA draft, Janning played with the Boston Celtics in the Orlando Summer League and later for the Phoenix Suns in the Las Vegas Summer League. On August 4, 2010, he signed a multi-year contract with the Phoenix Suns. On November 16, he was released by the Phoenix Suns before appearing in a game for them.

On December 1, he was signed by the Maine Red Claws, after they released Jordan Eglseder, due to injury. On January 20, he was traded to the Rio Grande Valley Vipers, in exchange for Antonio Anderson. He led the Rio Grande Valley Vipers to the NBDL Finals, averaging 11 points per game.

On July 16, he signed a 1-year contract for $120,000 with Novipiù Casale Monferrato of the Lega Basket Serie A. In his first Italian League season, he averaged 12.6 points, 3.6 rebounds, and 1.7 assists per game, while shooting 41% from 2-point range, 38% from 3-point range, and 70% from the free throw stripe. Janning then played with the Indiana Pacers in the Orlando Summer League, and later for the Memphis Grizzlies, in the Las Vegas Summer League, during the 2012 summer.

Janning then signed with the reigning Italian League champions, Montepaschi Siena, in August 2012. He made the Lega Basket Serie A BEKO All-Star team.  In his 2nd Italian League season he is averaging 7.1 points, 2.3 rebounds, and 1.0 assists per game, while shooting 48% from 2-point range, 31% from 3-point range, and 87% from the free throw stripe.

On August 4, 2013, it was announced that Janning signed for Croatian champions Cibona Zagreb. He was released in December 2013, due to financial problems of the club. On January 3, 2014, he signed with his former club Montepaschi Siena for the rest of the season.

On July 10, 2014, he signed a 1+1 contract with the Turkish team Anadolu Efes.

On September 28, 2015, Janning signed with the Denver Nuggets. However, he was later waived by the Nuggets on October 15 in order for him to sign with Hapoel Jerusalem of the Israeli Basketball Premier League. On February 7, 2016, he parted ways with Hapoel Jerusalem. Two days later, he signed a deal with Lokomotiv Kuban until the end of the 2016–17 season.

On September 15, 2017, Janning signed a two-month deal with Baskonia of the Liga ACB and the EuroLeague to replace the injured Jordan McRae. He finally extended his contract for the whole season on November 17.

On July 6, 2018, Janning re-signed a one-year deal with Baskonia of the Liga ACB and the EuroLeague. On July 7, 2020, Janning was officially released from the Spanish club.

On December 23, 2020, he has signed with Baxi Manresa of the Liga ACB.

On June 30, 2021, Janning with Kawasaki Brave Thunders of the B.League for the 2021–22 season.

Georgia national team
On September 4, 2018, Janning got a Georgian passport, becoming a member of the Georgia national basketball team for the 2019 FIBA Basketball World Cup qualification games.

On September 13, 2018, he made his first appearance for the Georgian team in an 85–80 win over Israel, recording 15 points, three rebounds and three assists.

Career statistics

College

|-
| align="left" | 2006–07
| align="left" | Northeastern
| 32 || 31 || 35.4 || .414 || .353 || .724 || 4.5 || 2.8 || 0.9 || 0.2 || 11.6
|-
| align="left" | 2007–08
| align="left" | Northeastern
| 31 || 31 || 36.3 || .447 || .376 || .812 || 3.5 || 2.4 || 1.3 || 0.2 || 16.1
|-
| align="left" | 2008–09
| align="left" | Northeastern
| 32 || 32 || 36.0 || .406 || .323 || .742 || 4.7 || 2.7 || 1.5 || 0.2 || 14.3
|-
| align="left" | 2009–10
| align="left" | Northeastern
| 33 || 33 || 36.1 || .412 || .329 || .752 || 4.0 || 3.1 || 1.5 || 0.2 || 15.4
|- class="sortbottom"
| style="text-align:left;"| Career
| style="text-align:left;"|
| 128 || 127 || 35.9 || .419 || .345 || .757 || 4.2 || 2.8 || 1.3 || 0.2 || 14.3

EuroLeague

|-
| style="text-align:left;"| 2012–13
| style="text-align:left;"| Montepaschi
| 21 || 14 || 19.7 || .464 || .476 || .643 || 1.7 || 1.6 || .6 || .1 || 8.4 || 6.9
|-
| style="text-align:left;"| 2014–15
| style="text-align:left;"| Anadolu Efes
| 27 || 22 || 21.6 || .384 || .336 || .650 || 1.9 || 1.4 || .7 || .04 || 6.9 || 4.5
|-
| style="text-align:left;"| 2015–16
| style="text-align:left;"| Lokomotiv Kuban
| 14 || 0 || 21.9 || .443 || .393 || 1.000 || 1.8 || 1.4 || .4 || .1 || 8.6 || 7.8
|-
| style="text-align:left;"| 2017–18
| style="text-align:left;"| Baskonia
| 34 || 15 || 22.4 || .431 || .388 || .905 || 1.7 || 1.5 || .6 || .2 || 8.3 || 6.6
|-
| style="text-align:left;"| 2018–19
| style="text-align:left;"| Baskonia
| 28 || 17 || 25.0 || .413 || .377 || .795 || 2.1 || 1.8 || .8 || .1 || 10.1 || 8.8
|-
| style="text-align:left;"| 2019–20
| style="text-align:left;"| Baskonia
| 28 || 13 || 22.7 || .303 || .285 || .909 || 2.0 || 1.5 || .8 || .04 || 6.0 || 6.6
|- class="sortbottom"
| style="text-align:left;"| Career
| style="text-align:left;"|
| 152 || 81 || 22.2 || .402 || .370 || .809 || 2.1 || 1.7 || .7 || .1 || 8.0 || 6.9

References

External links
 Matt Janning's Northeastern bio.
 Matt Janning at eurobasket.com
 Matt Janning at euroleague.net
 Matt Janning at fiba.com
 Matt Janning at legabasket.it 
 Matt Janning at rivals.com
 

1988 births
Living people
ABA League players
American expatriate basketball people in Croatia
American expatriate basketball people in Greece
American expatriate basketball people in Italy
American expatriate basketball people in Israel
American expatriate basketball people in Russia
American expatriate basketball people in Spain
American men's basketball players
Anadolu Efes S.K. players
A.S. Junior Pallacanestro Casale players
Basketball players from Minnesota
Hapoel Jerusalem B.C. players
KK Cibona players
Liga ACB players
Maine Red Claws players
Men's basketball players from Georgia (country)
Mens Sana Basket players
Northeastern Huskies men's basketball players
PBC Lokomotiv-Kuban players
People from Watertown, Minnesota
Point guards
Rio Grande Valley Vipers players
Saski Baskonia players
Shooting guards
Sportspeople from the Minneapolis–Saint Paul metropolitan area